Hukou Town is an urban town in Chaling County, Hunan Province, People's Republic of China.

Cityscape

References

External links

Divisions of Chaling County